is a version of PC program RPG Maker series. It has been superseded by RPG Maker VX Ace, which is an improved and enhanced version of RPG Maker VX. Both RPG Maker VX and RPG Maker VX Ace are developed by Enterbrain, following its predecessor, RPG Maker XP. RPG Maker VX follows the naming pattern present in previous RPG Maker releases by having a suffix based on the Windows versions the software was designed for (in this case, Windows Vista and Windows XP).

RPG Maker editions

RPG Maker VX Trial

A Japanese trial for RPG Maker VX was released on Enterbrain's Japanese VX website and was available for download. It features limited and reduced features, like the inability to save games and limited database functionality. An English version of the program is also available from Enterbrain, with full functionality and a 30-day time limit.

RPG Maker VX RTP

The standard runtime package for RPG Maker VX is available for download on the Enterbrain website. This allows users to play games created with RPG Maker VX. It was developed so that games used mostly default resources and can be distributed to the public with a small file size.

RPG Maker VX history

Early Japan order included Masterpiece Note notebook.

In late January 2008, Enterbrain of Japan released an update that included an extra script which improved performance. This release was called RPG Maker VX 1.01 and is available to those who own the full version of the program. The last version at the moment is 1.02.

Bonus contents

The retail version of RPG Maker VX includes following game demos, which are also available separately from the Enterbrain website:

Dragoness Edge 2820 (by SAURASUDO)
Invas ~ Tai Ma Roku (INVAS～退魔録) (by MENCHAN)
Michiru Service! ~Spirit World Border Tale~ (ミチル見参！ ～魔界境物語～) (by Asa son)
Buried Book (by Yuwaka)
Futago no kami-sama (フタゴノカミサマ)
Rector and the Black Lion's Crest (レクトールと黒獅子の紋章) (by Shine Garden)
Sword of Algus (by Yoshimura (Material Quest Online), mackie (First Seed Material), Shine Garden)
Abyss Diver

They feature advanced effects such as pseudo-3D battle graphics, custom battle systems written in RGSS2 and more. Sword of Algus and Abyss Diver are not included with Japanese version of the product.

Expansions

Several optional add-ons have been released for RPG Maker VX. These are most commonly resource or graphical add-ons, though not always.

Thus far, the following add-ons have been released as purchases from the official RPG Maker website:
 
Materials for VX: SAMURAI - 侍 (ツクールシリーズ素材集　和): It is an official art pack for the RPG Maker VX series. Japanese retail version also includes Chouichirou Kenpuuden (長一郎剣風伝) demo.
Chibi Chara Tsukuru (ちびキャラツクール) character graphic generator was released on 2008-03-14 as freeware.
High Fantasy Resource Pack: An official resource pack containing resources designed for creating Western style RPGs, with realistically proportioned characters and tiles instead of anime or chibi style graphics. It is only available from the English language site and has not been released in Japan.
RPG Maker 3 Music Pack: A set of BGM tracks taken from RPG Maker 3 and remastered for use in the PC edition.
Modern tileset add-on: this add-on contains tilesets intended for creating modern or science-fiction environments. It only contains tilesets and does not have any other types of resources. A modern shop expansion was later released for it containing additional tilesets for creating modern interiors and shops.
Arabian Nights tileset add-on: this is a pack containing Middle Eastern themed tilesets for creating games that take place in an Arabian setting. Like the Modern tileset add-on, it does not contain resources other than tilesets, though 4 Arabian themed BGM tracks are included in the pack.

Features
Many of the features included in previous versions of RPG Makers made a return, though other features (such as the use of map fogs and tilesets of infinite size) that were present in RPG Maker XP were removed.

Mapping System

The mapping system in RPG Maker VX differs greatly from the one used in RPG Maker XP. Instead of assigning tile sets to each map, there are nine global tile sets which can be used indiscriminately. The layer system used in previous releases has also changed, as RPG Maker VX only has two "usable" layers; one layer for Tile set A1 to A5 (which contains tiles for floors, walls, etc.) and another for tile sets B to E. Tilemap class in RGSS supports three layers, but two of them are used for combining tilesets from A1 and A2, in order to produce the autotile mapping system. Any tile from tile sets B to E always go above any tile from tile set A1-A5. It is possible, however, to create another layer of sorts assigning tile set graphics to events.

For users to import their own tiles, RPG Maker VX provides a blank, 512x512 tile set (a total of 256 possible tiles) which is by default tile set E. The size of this tile set cannot be changed, unlike in RPG Maker XP, where users could import any number of tile sets which could be of any size.

Generally, the tilesets tended to be more general than RMXP, since no tilesets are used aside from global ones; however, this prevents greater and more specialized usage of tiles. There are also fewer tiles than XP.

Character and Object Tiles
Tiles used for characters and objects in the native RMVX tilesets are "square-sized" with deformed profiles (similar to those found in Final Fantasy IV) rather than the height-proportional figures found in previous RPG Maker versions (or Final Fantasy VI). Designers who prefer the more realistic look of "tall" characters may readily make use of RMXP character and object tiles for this purpose. Tiles from RM2K, however, are essentially unusable because of their much-lower graphical resolution.

Text System
RPG Maker VX uses a "letter by letter" text system, as opposed to the previous version RPG Maker XP. The Windowskin graphic has been expanded to include overlay graphics, which tile automatically on top of the main Windowskin. It also and now has an image-defined color palette, where in XP users would have to use the script editor to change text colors. The faceset system seen in RPG Maker 2000 and RPG Maker 2003 can be implemented through the "Enter Message" command. Previously, users would use a special event command to change text options. In RPG Maker VX, however, the options have been merged to the "Enter Message" command.

Random Dungeon Generator
Making a second appearance is the Automatic Dungeon Generator from RPG Maker 2003, which automatically generates a random dungeon map. The Automatic Dungeon Generator works by prompting the user to select wall and floor tiles, then a basic dungeon is generated based on the user's selection.

Battle System
The default battle system in RPG Maker VX is an update of the front-view battle system seen in RPG Maker 2000 ("Dragon Warrior" style), which does not allow for character graphics. However, user-made add-on scripts exist that change the battle system; side-view battles reminiscent of Final Fantasy, real time battle systems and even tactical battle systems may all be implemented by the user.

Ruby Game Scripting System 2 (RGSS2)
The script editor from RPG Maker XP was updated, and is based on the language RGSS2. Users can add custom scripts to the game or edit existing ones, and the capabilities of RGSS2 provide sufficient flexibility that programmers with enough time and knowledge can add or modify virtually any game function that suits their purposes.

Quick Event Creation
A new feature to RPG Maker VX is the "Quick Event Creation" function. It's a tool that allows less experienced users to create events for doors, inns, and treasure chests.

Reception
RPG Maker VX received a generally positive reception. Cheat Code Central scored it 4 out of 5. It has been praised for being much more user friendly than previous RPG Makers and for including a variety of features that otherwise had to be coded manually in previous RPG Maker installments. The addition of RGSS2 has also been received favorably among users, but the battle system was criticized for having no graphical representation of the actual player characters and for being largely text-based. However, scripts to make party members appear on the battle-screen, akin to Final Fantasy titles, are easily found on the internet, which simply need to be copied and pasted. It has also been criticized for the limitations of the default tile set, which only allow for a very small number of unique-looking town areas.

System requirements

 64-bit operating systems are supported in RPG Maker VX Ace but others versions of RPG Maker have not yet been confirmed to work with 64-bit operating systems.

† Retail versions of the software packaged for sale in stores come on CD-ROM, but no optical drive is required for copies purchased via download. An internet connection is required for product activation, however, whether purchased on CD-ROM or via download.

All hardware must be DirectX-compatible.

RPG Maker VX VALUE!

This version includes RPG Maker VX and Materials for VX: SAMURAI - 侍 art pack, but supports 64-bit operating systems. System requirements mostly follow RPG Maker VX Ace.

RPG Maker VX Ace

Following the release of RPG Maker VX, Enterbrain released RPG Maker VX Ace on December 15, 2011 in Japan, and March 15, 2012 worldwide. RPG Maker VX Ace is basically an enhanced version of RPG Maker VX. Some of the improvements of RPG Maker VX Ace over its predecessor are:
 Introduction of RGSS3, which is an improvement over VX's RGSS2.
 Integrated character generator.
 The return of unlimited tilesets.
 Add a third layer to maps to allow for more tiles stacked on top of each other.
 The Ruby interpreter is updated to 1.9 from VX's 1.8.3 which has significant speed improvements in processor intensive tasks.
 Improved Event and Mapping Systems.
 Region ID's.
 Traits System.
 Easy Shadow control.
 Window color changer.
 Party caterpillar system.
 Character descriptions.
 A battle background generator.
 Support for Ogg Theora video playback.

While projects created with RPG Maker VX cannot be imported directly to RPG Maker VX Ace, VX Ace is backwards compatible with map files created in VX (by manually changing their file extension) and certain resources from its predecessor.

On December 10, 2012, RPG Maker VX Ace was also released on Steam. The Steam version includes support for the Steam Workshop, allowing content creators to share their games, or resources online.

RPG Maker VX Ace was succeeded by RPG Maker MV in October 23, 2015.

RPG Maker VX Ace Lite
While there is a 30-day evaluation version of RPG Maker VX Ace, Enterbrain has also released a free "Lite" version, called RPG Maker VX Ace Lite. It is a trial version which removes the 30 day limit, but adds certain limitations in usage:
 A reminder window shows every time the program opens.
 No call script function.
 No script editing. While the editor can be used to view the scripts in a project, it doesn't allow saving any modifications to them.
 10 events per map.
 20 maps maximum.
 While it can export the games created with it, it cannot encrypt them.
 The Database management has also certain restrictions, including the inability to change the preset maximum of assets per category:
10 heroes.
10 classes.
126 skills.
16 items.
60 weapons.
60 armors.
30 enemies.
30 troops.
25 states.
110 animations.
10 common events.
4 Tilesets.

Enterbrain has also released RPG Maker VX Ace Lite Nico Nico Edition (RPGツクールVX Ace Lite ニコニコエディション) in Japan, which is a special version of RPG Maker VX Ace Lite that was distributed for Nico Nico Douga, which also has the following changes:
License to publish games at Niconico jisaku game fes site (powered by niwango, inc.) and for non-commercial use.
Includes Nico Nico Douga icons and graphic materials.
Movie playback feature is disabled.
This special version was only available until March 31, 2013.

System requirements

Internet connection is required for product activation.

Reception
RPG Maker VX Ace has received a positive reception on Steam. VX Ace holds a 94% user rating, while VX Ace Lite holds a 93% user rating. VX Ace has sold over 500,000 units on Steam, as of October 2021.

References

External links
Official website 

VX
Video game IDE